Marc St. Gil (February 10, 1924 – August 13, 1992) was a Dutch-American photographer, best known for his work with the Environmental Protection Agency.

Life 
St. Gil was born in Helmond, Netherlands on February 10, 1924. Following his immigration to the US, he became a photojournalist, eventually being hired as a contributing photographer to the young EPA's DOCUMERICA project. He died on August 13, 1992, in Katy, Texas.

DOCUMERICA 
DOCUMERICA was an EPA-sponsored program created "photographically document subjects of environmental concern" lasting from 1971 to 1977. Among the dozens of prominent photographers hired for the program, St. Gil specialized in documenting nature, rural life, and pollution in Southern Texas, with the focus of his work being in and around Leakey, Houston and San Antonio. The National Archives and Records Administration has digitized part of his photographic portfolio, and his works produced for DOCUMERICA are in the public domain, with hundreds of images available on Wikimedia Commons and Flickr.

Gallery

References

External links 

 

1924 births
1992 deaths
American ecologists
American photographers
Nature photographers
American photojournalists
People from Helmond